Gjerstad Church (locally: Gjerstad kjørke) is a parish church of the Church of Norway in Gjerstad Municipality in Agder county, Norway. It is located in the village of Gjerstad. It is the church for the Gjerstad parish which is part of the Aust-Nedenes prosti (deanery) in the Diocese of Agder og Telemark. The white, wooden church was built in a long church design in 1848 by Lars Listøl using plans by the architect Christian H. Grosch. The church seats about 500 people.

History
The earliest existing historical records of the church date back to the year 1400 (Gerikstadir Kirkje), but the church was likely founded around the year 1300. Historically, the parish of Gjerstad included the nearby areas of Vegårshei and Søndeled (which also included Risør. The parish was based in Søndeled from the 1100s until the 1400s when the headquarters of the parish was moved to Gjerstad. In 1737, the old church was torn down and a new church was constructed on the same site. The builder of the new church was Søren Knutsen from Arendal. In 1745, the areas of Søndeled and Risør were separated to form their own parish. During the 1760s, several repairs were carried out on the building, including work on the bell tower.

In 1814, this church served as an election church. Together with more than 300 other parish churches across Norway, it was a polling station for elections to the 1814 Norwegian Constituent Assembly which wrote the Constitution of Norway. This was Norway's first national elections. Each church parish was a constituency that elected people called "electors" who later met together in each county to elect the representatives for the assembly that was to meet in Eidsvoll later that year.

By the mid-1800s, the municipal council looked at the fact that there were over 2000 residents in the parish and seats for only 389 people in the church, so it was far too small. They wanted to nearby double the size of the church, so after standing for nearly 150 years, plans were begun to replace the building. Site work began in 1842, and construction on the building began in 1844. The new church was consecrated on 23 January 1848 by the Bishop Jacob von der Lippe and it wasn't put into regular use until mid-1849. The old church was used until the summer of 1849 when it was torn down and its material was sold. The cemetery south of the present church is where the old church was located.

In 2004, the church was renovated and restored to its original look.

Priests

There have been many priests who served at this church over the years.  This is a partial list.

Axel Pedersen (around 1552)
Gude Pedersen (around 1561)
Laurs (unknown dates)
Peder Jensen Holt (1578-1607)
Erik Olsen (unknown dates)
Lauritz Nilsen (1614-1620)
Erik Fredriksen Lindland (1621-1657)
Bent Pedersen Amdal (1657-1695)
Hans Pedersen Høllen (1695-1708)
Hans Lauritzen Scavenius (1709-1716)
Peder Olsen Horster (1716-1745)
Johan Joakim Markmann (1745-1750)
Lars Larsen Eskildsen (1750-1784)
Hans Mathias Abel (1784-1803)
Søren Georg Abel (1803-1821)
John Aas (1821-1867)
Lortenz Ditlev Krog (1867-1872)
Jørgen Christian Andreas Grøner (1873-1890)
Georg Pharo (1890-1899)
Knud Christian Jarl Møller (1899-1910)
Ragnvald Cornelius Knudsen (1910-1912)
Henrik Lehmann (1913-1930)
Ivar Glette (1930-1952)
Gunnar Bjarne Gundersen (1953-1959)
Karl Trygve Lehne (1959-1968)
Arne Johan Sørensen (1969-1974)
Ravn Madland (1975-1980)
Gerhard Falk Woie (1981-1993)
Nils Peder Kjetså (1993-??)
Olav Hofsli (dates unknown)

Media gallery

See also
List of churches in Agder og Telemark

References

Gjerstad
Churches in Agder
Wooden churches in Norway
19th-century Church of Norway church buildings
Churches completed in 1848
14th-century establishments in Norway
Norwegian election church